Tamanu oil is pressed from nuts of either Calophyllum inophyllum (usually) or Calophyllum tacamahaca (ati), tropical trees belonging to the Calophyllaceae family. The nuts yield 70–75% the greenish-yellow inedible oil. The oil originates in Polynesia, where it continues to play an important cultural role. Commercial uses of tamanu oil are predominantly for skin care.  The oil has both medicinal value and use as a fuel. Calophyllum inophyllum oil (CIO) is rich in antioxidants and contains UV-absorption properties that can be used within the dermatology field. Tamanu oil has been found to have wound healing and antibacterial properties in low concentration, but is cytotoxic (cell-damaging) in high concentration.

Uses 
The seeds yield a thick, dark green oil, used medicinally or as hair grease.  The first neoflavone isolated in 1951 from natural sources was calophyllolide from C. inophyllum seeds.

The fatty acid methyl esters derived from C. inophyllum seed oil meet the major biodiesel requirements in the United States (ASTM D 6751), and European Union (EN 14214).  The average oil yield is 11.7 kg-oil/tree or 4680 kg-oil/hectare.  In the northwest coastal areas of Luzon island in the Philippines, the oil was used for night lamps.  This widespread use started to decline when kerosene, and later electricity, became available.  It was also used as fuel to generate electricity to power radios during World War II. A farmer in Nagappattinam district of Tamil Nadu, India, has successfully used the oil as biodiesel to run his 5-hp pumpset.

In Southern India, the oil is used to treat skin diseases: it is also applied topically in cases of rheumatism. The oil may have been useful in waterproofing cloth and is used as a varnish. An extract from the fruit was once used to make a brown dye to colour cloth. The oil can also be used to make soap.

In most of the South Sea islands, tamanu (or sultan champa) oil is used as an analgesic medicine (natives use it for sciatica and rheumatism) and to cure ulcers and bad wounds.

Oil extracted from the seeds is traditionally used topically to treat a wide range of skin injuries from burn, scar and infected wounds to skin diseases such as dermatosis, urticaria and eczema. CIO has been confirmed to be a safe topical solution. Studies showed that, through scratch test assay, CIO in 0.1% concentration accelerates keratinocyte wound healing.

CIO exhibits high antibacterial activity against bacterial strains involved in acne.

Recently, studies have shown that CIO appears a promising source to develop new antibiotics, notably to fight multi-drug resistant bacteria implicated in skin infections.

Other names 
It is also called beauty leaf oil, calophyllum inophyllum seed oil, calophyllum inophyllum oil, kamani oil, calophyllum oil, calophyllum inophyllum essential oil, dilo oil, foraha oil, Alexandrian laurel oil, poon oil, nyamplung oil, domba oil, honne oil (Honge is used as biodiesel),  oil, pinnai oil, fetau oil, punnai oil,  oil, pinnay oil, kamanu oil, bitaog oil, tamanu nut oil, punna oil, takamaka oil (ambiguous), laurelwood oil (ambiguous), tacamahac oil (ambiguous), punnaga oil, fetaʻu oil, palo maria oil, ballnut tree oil, ballnut oil, btaches oil, beach calophyllum oil, or  oil.
Chamorro: 
English: beauty leaf, Alexandrian laurel
Hindi:  
Indonesia: 
Japanese:  
Kannada: , 
Konkani:  ,  
Malayalam:  
Oriya:    
Tamil:  
Tulu: 
Urdu:  
Vietnamese:

Fruits 

Fruiting takes place twice a year, in May and November. The fruit (the ball nut) is a round, green drupe reaching 2 to 4 cm in diameter and having a single large seed. When ripe, the fruit is wrinkled and its color varies from yellow to brownish-red. The weight of the fruit is 9 to 16.0 g when fresh. After drying, the weight is reduced to about  4 g. Ripe and fallen fruits are collected from the bottom of the tree, by beating the limbs with a long hand stick, or hand-picked by climbing the tree.

Kernel 

The kernel comprises 43–52% of the weight of the whole dry fruit. The kernel is 1.5 cm in diameter, enclosed in a soft- and a hard seed coat. The kernel contains 55–73% oil and 25% moisture when fresh.

Seed processing and extraction of oil 

The seeds are decorticated by wooden mallets or by decorticators or by pressing under planks. Usually, the kernels are pressed in wooden and stone ghani.

Properties and fatty acids of oil 

The oil is bluish-yellow to dark green and viscous, known as domba-, pinnai- or dilo oil. It has a disagreeable taste and odour as it contains some resinous material that can easily be removed by refining. The concentration of resinous substances in the oil varies from 10 to 30%. The main compounds of the seed oil are oleic-, linoleic-, stearic- and palmitic acids.

Physical characteristics

Fatty acids present in oil
Another source says the oil contains the following fatty acids:

Other components include calophyllolide, friedelin, inophyllums B and P, terpenic essences,  benzoic and oxibenzoic acids, phospho-amino lipids, glycerides, saturated fatty acids, and 4-phenylcoumarins.

References

External links 
Prospects and potential of fatty acid methyl esters of some non-traditional seed oils for use as biodiesel in India
 International Journal Of Energy and International Environmental Engineering
 Bogor Agricultural University Scientific Repository
 Impact of palm, mustard, waste cooking oil and Calophyllum inophyllum biofuels on performance and emission of CI engine
 Tamanu oil Botanical Data profile

Essential oils
Vegetable oils